The Millennium Biltmore Hotel, originally the Los Angeles Biltmore of the Bowman-Biltmore Hotels group, is a luxury hotel located opposite Pershing Square in Downtown Los Angeles, California. Upon its grand opening in 1923, the Los Angeles Biltmore was the largest hotel west of Chicago in the United States. In 1969 the Biltmore Hotel was designated a Los Angeles Historic-Cultural Monument by the City of Los Angeles. In 1951, the Los Angeles Biltmore Hotel Company sold to Corrigan Properties for more than $12 million. Regal Hotels purchased the Biltmore in 1996, and then sold it in 1999 to Millennium & Copthorne Hotels. As of 2009, the Los Angeles Biltmore is operated as part of the Millennium & Copthorne Hotels chain as the Millennium Biltmore Hotel. The hotel has  of meeting and banquet space. From its original 1500 guestrooms it now has 683, due to room reorganization.

Architecture

The architectural firm Schultze & Weaver designed the Biltmore's exterior in a synthesis of the Spanish-Italian Renaissance Revival, Mediterranean Revival, and Beaux Arts styles, meant as an homage to the Castilian heritage of Los Angeles. The "Biltmore Angel" is heavily incorporated into the design—as a symbol of the city as well as the Biltmore itself.  With a thick steel and concrete frame, the structure takes up half a city block and rises over 11 stories.

The interiors of the Biltmore Hotel are decorated with: frescos and murals; carved marble fountains and columns; massive wood-beamed ceilings; travertine and oak paneled walls; lead crystal chandeliers; cast bronze stairwells and doorways; fine artisan marquetry and mill work; and heavily embroidered imported tapestries and draperies. Most notable are the frescoed mural ceilings in the main Galleria and the Crystal Ballroom, which were hand painted in 1922 by Italian artist John B. Smeraldi, known for his work in the Vatican and the White House. Smeraldi and his team famously painted the ballroom's colorful, seamless fresco over a period of seven months, decorating it with figures of Greek and Roman gods, angels, cupids and other mythological creatures. It was meticulously restored in the 1980s by Smeraldi's apprentice, Anthony Heinsbergen.

The Rendezvous Court, once the hotel's lobby but now used primarily for afternoon tea, is decorated with a Moorish Revival styled plaster ceiling painted with 24 Carat Gold accents, two original imported Italian chandeliers from 1923, and a grand Spanish Baroque Revival bronze doorway, whose astrological clock still keeps time today. Two figures appear on the stairwell front—on the left is the Roman goddess of agriculture Ceres, while on the right is the Spanish explorer Vasco Núñez de Balboa. The current lobby at the hotel's Grand Avenue entrance still has its original travertine walls and oak paneling as well as the large artificial skylighted ceiling, reflected in the custom carpet below.

Each ballroom on the Galleria level is themed either after the room's original function or the hotel's overall California-heritage premise. The Emerald Room was once the hotel's main guest dining room; its decor features images of hunt and harvest, with hand-painted animals and fish on the cast-plaster ceiling beams. The Tiffany Room was formerly an open corridor used as a drop-off point for Crystal Ballroom functions. Now enclosed, the elegant space centers around exploration, with relief sculptures and panels depicting Queen Isabella I of Castile, and Christopher Columbus and other Spanish New World explorers. The split-level Gold Room, once a dining room for elite guests, features Prohibition-era hidden liquor compartments and panels along the ceiling for press photographers to take pictures of the event below. It is decorated with a gold cast-plaster ceiling, hand-oiled wood paneling, and nine mirrored windows along three sides.

The South Galleria is painted with floral friezes inspired by the decor of ancient Roman Pompeii, and features a vaulted ceiling, marble balustrades and heavy Roman piers. Gold-painted wrought iron gates open to a staircase leading down to the Biltmore Bowl.

Also of interest is the hotel's health club and indoor pool, which was modeled after the decks of 1920s luxury ocean liners. Solid brass trim on windows, doors and railings, teakwood deck chairs and hand-laid Italian mosaic tile on the walls and in the pool are original.

Restaurants
Since 2015, four restaurants and bars serve the hotel, including Smeraldi's Restaurant (American continental cuisine), newly relaunched Bugis Street Brasserie, the Rendezvous Court, and the Gallery Bar.

Events

The Los Angeles Biltmore is known for being an early home to the Academy Awards ceremony—the Oscars.  The Academy of Motion Picture Arts and Sciences was founded at a luncheon banquet in the Crystal Ballroom in May 1927, when guests such as Louis B. Mayer met to discuss plans for the new organization and presenting achievement awards to colleagues in their industry.  Legend has it that MGM art director Cedric Gibbons, who was in attendance, immediately grabbed a linen Biltmore napkin and sketched the design for the Oscar statue on it. Eight Oscar ceremonies were held in the Biltmore Bowl during the Academy's early years of 1931, 1935–1939, and 1941–1942. The band leader Shep Fields conducted his "Rippling Rhythm Orchestra" during the 1939 ceremonies at the Biltmore. Decades later in 1977, Bob Hope hosted the Academy's 50th Anniversary banquet in the same room.

The Biltmore Theater was situated at the corner of 5th and Grand, now the Biltmore Court & Tower location. Will Rogers emceed the opening of the theater in 1924, which then hosted plays starring Helen Hayes, Katharine Hepburn, Alfred Lunt, Lynn Fontanne, Bela Lugosi and Mae West until it closed in 1967.  It also occasionally booked high-profile films such as the 1925 silent epic Ben Hur: A Tale of the Christ which ran for 14 weeks in 1926 and silent Academy Award winner Wings, which stayed over 20 weeks in 1928.

In 1929, Germany's Graf Zeppelin airship soared over the hotel on its round-the-world voyage, sponsored by newspaper magnate William Randolph Hearst.  Crew and passengers were fed by Biltmore culinary staff, who also replenished their on-board supplies.

The Los Angeles Biltmore hotel also featured notable recordings from the early 1930s on the Brunswick record label by Earl Burtnett & His Los Angeles Biltmore Hotel Orchestra, with songs such as the popular "Putting on the Ritz" being recorded with an orchestra attributed to the hotel.

During World War II, the Biltmore served as a military rest and recreation facility, with the entire second floor equipped with cots for military personnel on leave.

On March 7, 1952, the well-known yogi and author Paramahansa Yogananda, collapsed and died of a heart attack after finishing a speech in honor of the Indian ambassador Binay Ranjan Sen. This site within the hotel is now revered by many as the place of the yogi's mahasamadhi, or conscious leave of the body.

The 1960 Democratic National Convention in Los Angeles chose John F. Kennedy as the party's presidential nominee. He set up his campaign headquarters in the Music Room (now the Lobby), with running mate Lyndon B. Johnson across the hall in the Emerald Room.  Their press conferences in the Crystal Ballroom were heavily photographed and documented.

The Beatles paid a visit to the Presidential Suite in August 1964 during their first U.S. tour.  Due to the overwhelming number of fans crowding the sidewalks in front of the hotel, the "Fab Four" were forced to access their room by landing atop the hotel in a helicopter.

The Los Angeles Biltmore Hotel served the International Olympic Committee as their headquarters during the 1984 Summer Olympics. In 1988, the Duke & Duchess of York were hosted by Armand Hammer at a Biltmore gala.  Recently the Biltmore has hosted the semi-finals for American Idol, the yearly awards for the Cinemal Audio Society, visiting teams for the World Baseball Classic, and multiple Grammy Awards after-parties.

Films and TV shows
Scenes from many movies and television shows have been filmed at the hotel, including:

Movies
10 Things I Hate About You (1999), Alien Nation (1988), Bachelor Party (1984), Beverly Hills Cop (1984), Blow (2001), Blue Streak (1999), Bugsy (1991), Chinatown (1974), Cruel Intentions (1999), Daredevil (2003), Dave (1993), The Fabulous Baker Boys (1989), The Game (1997), Austin Powers: International Man of Mystery (1997), Ghostbusters (1984), Heartbreakers (2001), In the Line of Fire (1993), Independence Day (1996), The Italian Job (2003),  National Treasure: Book of Secrets (2007), The Nutty Professor (1996), Ocean's 11 (1960), Pretty in Pink (1986), Prom Night (2008), Something New (2006), Splash (1984),  A Star Is Born (1937), They Live (1988), True Lies (1994), Wedding Crashers (2005), The Wedding Ringer (2015),  Rocky III (1982)

The hotel's exterior can also be seen in Fight Club (1999) and Heat (1995).

Television

24, Ally McBeal, Beverly Hills, 90210, Black Monday, Bosch, Charlie's Angels, Columbo, CSI: NY, Drop Dead Diva, Entourage, ER, Glee, The Good Place, Heroes, House, Leverage, Mad Men, Mob City, Nip/Tuck, NYPD Blue, The Real Housewives of Beverly Hills, Timeless, Scandal, That '70s Show, War and Remembrance, The West Wing, Dinner for Five, Hacks (TV series), The Golden Girls, Murder, She Wrote

The hotel was featured in Visiting... with Huell Howser Episode 625, as well as a commercial for Stanton Optical, a company based in Palm Springs, Florida. The hotel's exterior can also be seen in  Curb Your Enthusiasm.

Music videos
Steve Perry, Oh Sherrie (1984); Janet Jackson, Son of a Gun (I Betcha Think This Song Is About You) (2001); Britney Spears, Overprotected (Darkchild Remix) (2002); Simple Plan, Shut Up! (2005); The Wallflowers (2005); Daniel Powter (2005); Lostprophets (2009); Anjulie, "Rain" (2009); Daughtry (2009); Tank (2010); Alexander Kogan (2011); Chris Price, Homesick (2012); Ed Sheeran, Thinking Out Loud (2014); John Legend (featuring Chance the Rapper), Penthouse Floor (2016); Taylor Swift, Delicate (2018); Jennifer Lopez, El Anillo (2018); Meek Mill & Drake, Going Bad (2019).

References

External links 

 
 "It's De Limit"  Forbes article by Finn-Olaf Jones on Biltmore architects Schultze and Weaver, April 24, 2006

1923 establishments in California
Bowman-Biltmore Hotels
Buildings and structures in Downtown Los Angeles
Commercial buildings completed in 1923
Hotel buildings completed in 1923
Hotels established in 1923
Hotels in Los Angeles
Biltmore